The following is a list of fixtures and results of the Philippines women's national beach volleyball team against other national teams.

Fixtures and results

1998

2005

2006

2009

2010

2017

2018

2019

2021

2022

References 

Beach volleyball in the Philippines